The 1890–91 season is the 1st season of competitive football by Heart of Midlothian. Hearts also competed in the Scottish Cup, the Rosebery Charity Cup and the East of Scotland Shield.

Overview 
Hearts finished 6th in the league in its inaugural year, also going on to win the Scottish Cup for the first time.

Results

Scottish Football League

Scottish cup

East of Scotland Shield

Rosebery Charity Cup

Edinburgh International Exhibition Cup

League table

See also
List of Heart of Midlothian F.C. seasons

References 

 Statistical Record 90-91

External links 
 Official Club website

Heart of Midlothian F.C. seasons
Hearts